Gloria Young  (née Anozie; born 4 February 1967) is a Nigerian actress and former journalist who has featured in more than 70 movies and has won the City People Movie Award for Movie Couple of the Year at the City People Entertainment Awards.

Early life and education
Young was born in Abia State, a south eastern geographical area of Nigeria. She received primary and secondary education in Fountain School located at Surulere in Lagos State And she studied at Methodist Girls High School, Yaba Lagos, where she obtained her first school leaving certificate & WAEC certificate respectively. Young obtained a Bachelor’s degree in Mass Communication from a university in Dallas, USA. She later returned to Nigeria in 1987 and worked as an energy correspondent with the Daily Times before joining the Nigerian Movie Industry.

Career
Young began her career as a journalist then delved into entertainment and became an entertainer on the Charly Boy (A comedy skit) Show which was a reality show about Charly Boy. Her acting career came into limelight in 1994 when she took an active role in the movie titled “Glamour Girls” which eventually became a successful project. Young who played the character Doris in the Glamour Girls movie featured alongside Nollywood prominent actors; Dolly Unachukwu, Liz Benson, Eucharia Anunobi, Zack Orji, Sola Fosudo, Ngozi Ezeonu, Keppy Ekpenyong, and Sandra Achums. A Vanguard publication described her as one who ruled the Nigerian movie industry in the 90s.

In 2022 she was a co-star in the Nigerian streaming series Diiche which was produced by James Omokwe and starring Uzoamaka Aniunoh. Her co-stars were Uzoamaka Onuoha, Chinyere Wilfred and Frank Konwea. The premier in October in Lagos was hosted by Chigul.

Award

Personal life
Young is married to Nollywood colleague Norbert Young and both have three children together.  A novelty football match was organized at the National Stadium in Surulere, Lagos state in other to celebrate her silver jubilee in Nollywood.

Selected filmography
Flee
Passionate Appeal
The Soul That Sinneth
Wanted At All Cost
Back To Life
The Return
Deadly Affair
Glamour Girls
Kpali  
Rattlesnake: The Ahanna Story

See also 
List of Nigerian actors

References

External links
 

Living people
Nigerian actresses
Igbo actresses
1967 births
Actresses from Abia State
21st-century Nigerian actresses
Nigerian journalists